Live at the Copa is Bobby Vinton's first live album, released in 1966.

It is a recording of a performance that Vinton made at the Copacabana in New York with the Dixieland band of the Village Stompers and the Joe Mele Orchestra. In the "Old MacDonald Medley", Vinton plays different instruments rather than sing. This performance demonstrates Vinton's range as a well-rounded performer rather than just a ballad singer.

Track listing

References

1966 live albums
Bobby Vinton live albums
Epic Records live albums